Coquet Island  is a small island of about , situated  off Amble on the Northumberland coast, northeast England. It is included in the civil parish of Hauxley.

Bird reserve
The island is owned by the Duke of Northumberland. The Royal Society for the Protection of Birds manages the island as a bird reserve, for its important seabird colonies.

The most numerous species is the puffin, with over 18,000 pairs     
nesting in 2002, but the island is most important for the largest colony of the endangered roseate tern in Britain, which, thanks to conservation measures including the provision of nestboxes to protect the nests from gulls and bad weather, has risen to 118 pairs in 2018. Other nesting birds include sandwich tern, common tern, Arctic tern, black-legged kittiwake, fulmar, three other gull species, and eider duck.

The island is uninhabited in winter, but seasonal wardens are present throughout the summer to protect the nesting birds. Landing on Coquet Island for the general public is prohibited, but local boating companies from Amble sail close up to the island in good weather throughout the summer, allowing visitors to get good views of the puffins and roseate terns.

Coquet Lighthouse

Coquet Island was the home at one time of Henry of Coquet (died 1127), a Dane who lived in a hermitage here. The island also holds the remaining structure of a medieval monastery on the southwestern shore, which was largely incorporated into the 19th-century lighthouse and lighthouse keepers' cottages. 

Coquet Lighthouse was built by Trinity House in 1841 at a cost of £3,268. James Walker designed the lighthouse, which is a white square tower of sandstone, with walls more than one metre thick, surrounded by a turreted parapet. The first keeper at Coquet Lighthouse was William Darling, the elder brother of Grace Darling.

The lighthouse was initially provided with a large (first-order) fixed dioptric along with a set of mirrors (which were replaced with refracting prisms ten years later); the lens was by Isaac Cookson & co. of Newcastle upon Tyne. The lamp was oil-fuelled. In 1854 red sectors were added, to warn ships of Hauxley Point to the south and Boulmer Rocks to the north. Later, in 1870, a separate sector light was added, pointing south from a lower window in the tower. In 1891 both lights were made much more powerful; the main lamp was replaced with an eight-wick mineral-oil burner, and its character was changed to occulting (being eclipsed for 2.5 seconds every minute).

An explosive fog signal was established at the lighthouse in 1902, which sounded once every seven-and-a-half minutes; later sounding every three minutes, it was still in use in the 1970s. The light was electrified in 1976; up until this date a paraffin vapour burner provided the main light, and an old-style Argand lamp provided the sector light.

In 1990 the lighthouse was automated, at which point a revolving array of quartz halogen sealed beam lamps were installed in place of the old optic, with columns of lamps grouped in threes on a rotating pedestal, so as to display three flashes every 30 seconds. Subsequently, these were replaced by a small revolving optic, mounted on an AGA PRB gearless drive. Coquet's light has been solar powered since 2008.

After its removal from the tower, the original 1841–1851 optic was exhibited (along with the old occulting apparatus) at the Trinity House National Lighthouse Museum. After the museum closed they were loaned to Souter Lighthouse where they were displayed for a number of years.

See also 

 List of lighthouses in England
 The Farne Islands; another important bird reserve about 30 km to the north
 Henry of Coquet (12th century) – Danish hermit and miracleworking saint who lived on this island

References

External links 
 Trinity House
 Tide times for Coquet Island from the BBC and Easytide.
 History of Coquet Island. (Modified from "A History of Northumberland", volume V,  by John Crawford Hodgson. Published 1899).

Uninhabited islands of Northumberland
Coquet Island
Sites of Special Scientific Interest in Northumberland